Richland is a city in Keokuk County, Iowa, United States. The population was 542 at the time of the 2020 census.

Geography
Richland is located at  (41.184899, -91.993871).

Demographics

2010 census
As of the census of 2010, there were 584 people, 239 households, and 161 families living in the city. The racial makeup of the city was 98.5% White, 0.3% African American, 0.7% Native American, and 0.5% from two or more races. Hispanic or Latino of any race were 0.3% of the population.

There were 239 households, of which 31.4% had children under the age of 18 living with them, 54.4% were married couples living together, 10.9% had a female householder with no husband present, 2.1% had a male householder with no wife present, and 32.6% were non-families. 28.5% of all households were made up of individuals, and 15.1% had someone living alone who was 65 years of age or older. The average household size was 2.44 and the average family size was 3.01.

The median age in the city was 38.6 years. 27.2% of residents were under the age of 18; 6% were between the ages of 18 and 24; 25.6% were from 25 to 44; 22.7% were from 45 to 64; and 18.5% were 65 years of age or older. The gender makeup of the city was 49.1% male and 50.9% female.

2000 census
As of the census of 2000, there were 587 people, 251 households, and 164 families living in the city. The racial makeup of the city was 98.98% White, and 1.02% from two or more races. Hispanic or Latino of any race were 1.02% of the population.

There were 251 households, out of which 32.3% had children under the age of 18 living with them, 53.0% were married couples living together, 10.0% had a female householder with no husband present, and 34.3% were non-families. 32.3% of all households were made up of individuals, and 16.3% had someone living alone who was 65 years of age or older. The average household size was 2.34 and the average family size was 2.92.

In the city, the population was spread out, with 26.1% under the age of 18, 6.3% from 18 to 24, 26.6% from 25 to 44, 22.3% from 45 to 64, and 18.7% who were 65 years of age or older. The median age was 39 years. For every 100 females, there were 90.6 males. For every 100 females age 18 and over, there were 88.7 males.

The median income for a household in the city was $32,813, and the median income for a family was $46,806. Males had a median income of $31,442 versus $20,521 for females. The per capita income for the city was $14,726. About 11.9% of families and 16.8% of the population were below the poverty line, including 22.1% of those under age 18 and 13.4% of those age 65 or over.

Education
It is in the Pekin Community School District. Pekin Community High School is the local high school.

Richland had its own elementary and secondary school, which was constructed in the 1920s. In 1959, after much local controversy, Richland was incorporated into the Pekin Community School System. The high schools in Richland, Ollie, Packwood, and Farson were closed, although the buildings associated with them continued to be used for elementary and junior high school students. All the high school students from these four towns, along with all the rural areas which had been associated with these separate school systems, were then educated at a new building located near Pekin.

In 1970, a further consolidation eliminated the local junior high schools and replaced them with a consolidated middle school in Packwood: all students in grades six through eight began to go to Packwood, and, thereafter, the Richland school building was used only for elementary students (kindergarten through fifth grade) from Richland and its associated rural areas, including Rubio. Elementary students from elsewhere in the district went to Ollie, and the Farson school was closed. In this consolidation, all middle school students went to Packwood.

In 1978, after completion of a new structure adjacent to the Pekin High School building, all students in the district began to go to classes there. The Packwood and Richland school buildings were then closed. Richland's building is the only one of the four local schools to still stand although is in a state of dilapidation and has not been used since May 1978, when the final group of students finished their academic year.

Notable people

Paul McCracken (1915–2012 ) Chairman of the Council of Economic Advisors from 1969 to 1971 under President Richard Nixon.

References

External links

  
City-Data Comprehensive Statistical Data and more about Richland

Cities in Keokuk County, Iowa
Cities in Iowa